Caloto is a town and municipality in the Cauca Department, Colombia. It was founded on June 29, 1543 by Sebastián de Belalcázar.

Notable people
Davinson Sánchez, footballer
John Arlington González, footballer

References

Municipalities of Cauca Department